Kottamkara  is a village in Kollam district in the state of Kerala, India.

Demographics
 India census, Kottamkara had a population of 43732 with 21504 males and 22228 females.

References

Villages in Kollam district